Command systems in the United States Army refers to electronic command systems implemented by the US Army to carry out important central functions to operation of its units and major commands.

Overview

New systems for the 2020s

The Integrated Air & Missiles Defense Battle Command System (IBCS) is a new command system which the Army is developing for future use by Army combat units.

The Army Futures Command coordinates teams that manage a variety of central functions, such as networking,  aviation, long-range artillery, and unit navigation methods. The new Army Applications Lab in Austin, Texas, is delving into various forms of disruptive technology, which will provide new techniques for planning future combat.

See also
 United States Army
Command and Control

External links
 Official website, US Army Futures Command.

References

Command and control systems of the United States military
United States Army organization